Claude Constantino (13 December 1938 – 29 October 2019) was a Senegalese basketball player. He was of Cape Verdean descent. He competed in the men's tournament at the 1968 Summer Olympics.

References

External links
 

1938 births
2019 deaths
Senegalese men's basketball players
Olympic basketball players of Senegal
Basketball players at the 1968 Summer Olympics
Basketball players from Dakar
People of French West Africa
Senegalese people of Cape Verdean descent